The Old Hernando Elementary School (also known as the Lakeview School) is a historic site in Hernando, Florida, United States. It is located at 2435 North Florida Avenue. On May 4, 2001, it was added to the U.S. National Register of Historic Places.

References

Hernando Elementary School, Old
Hernando Elementary School, Old
Hernando Elementary School, Old
School buildings on the National Register of Historic Places in Florida
School buildings completed in 1942
1942 establishments in Florida